Former and lost communities in Markham lists a number of communities that have disappeared in Markham, Ontario either by renaming or no longer exist due to changes including population decline, economic decline, etc...

Australia

 
 Australia – located in the intersection of 19th Avenue and Ninth Line and namely centred on Lot 31 on Concession 9 on the farm once owned by William Holden. A tannery was the only notable business besides farming. The name was unofficial and not found on any maps during its existence in the mid-1800. This settlement disappeared as neighbouring areas like Markham Village and Stouffville flourished with improved roads and railway access. While still located in an agriculture area, the area to the north were annexed to Stouffville, Ontario in the 1970s and being developed into residential homes. Some properties on the south side of 19th Avenue are now part of the Rouge National Urban Park but continues to operate as farms.

Mannheim/Reesorville

 Mannheim – former name of Markham Village before 1804 and linked to the German settlers in the area.

 Reesorville – former name of Markham Village from 1804 to 1825, the Reesor family maintain presence in the area in the 19th and 20th centuries.

References

Neighbourhoods in Markham, Ontario